H1ghr Music (stylized as H1GHR MUSIC) (Hangul: 하이어뮤직레코즈) is an international hip hop and R&B record label founded by Korean American musician Jay Park and long time Seattle affiliate Cha Cha Malone in 2017. Stationed primarily in South Korea, the label was created with the intent to "bridge the gap" between American and Korean artists, with a focus on adjacent Seattle talent. Currently, the label houses over 17 artists.

History
H1ghr Music is a hip hop record label started in 2017 by Jay Park and Cha Cha Malone with the hopes of creating a more globally oriented label than Park's other Korean label, AOMG. Park created the label to show support for up and coming artists from his hometown of Seattle, Washington and South Korea through collaborations and bridge the gap between Korean and American Hip Hop artists. The name symbolizes the artists' goal to keep growing and to get to the next level. Label artist Avatar Darko was the one who suggested to replace the 'i' in Highr to a '1'.

The label launched with artists already signed. Aside from the founders, these artists included Yultron; Korean rappers Sik-K and pH-1; Seattle artists Avatar Darko, Raz Simone, Phe Reds, Jarv Dee. The label also began with producer roster consisting of GroovyRoom and Woogie.

Sik-K joined after participating in Show Me the Money 4 and after he parted ways with Grandline Entertainment, his former agency. His first single, titled "Fly", was released the same year. Raz Simone dropped his full-length album, Drive Theory, after signing.

Later on in 2017, H1ghr Music signed producer Thurxday (who was later resigned in 2019 under the new name Mokyo) and rapper Woodie Gochild. Woodie Gochild was signed after participating in Show Me the Money 6.

In 2018, H1GHR signed rapper Haon after he won the Korean rap survival show High School Rapper (Season 2) The same year he released his first EP, Travel: NOAH.

Singer Golden, formerly known as G.Soul, also announced he had joined H1ghr Music after 17 years of being signed to JYP Entertainment.

In 2019, the label signed the rapper Big Naughty after his participation in Show Me the Money 8.

In late 2019, Jarv Dee parted ways with H1ghr Music.

In 2020, the label released a remix version of Rain's song "Gang", which topped the Korean music charts. The same year, they signed a new artist, Trade L.

In August 2020, the label announced a compilation album featuring all the artists on the roster with Red Tape: H1GHR version being released on September 2, followed by “Blue Tape; : H1GHR” on September 16.

In March 2021, GroovyRoom announced that they are launching a new label called AREA (Hangul:에어리어), in partnership with the label.

On December 31, 2021, Jay Park announced his resignation as Co-CEO of H1ghr Music. In 2022, the label announced the end of their exclusive contracts with Woogie, Sik-K, and JAY B.

Key people 

Jay Park (Founder, Advisor | CEO, 2017–2021)
Cha Cha Malone (Co-CEO, 2017–present)

Artists

Rappers and singers
Big Naughty
Haon
pH-1
Woodie Gochild
TRADE L
JMin
Lil Moshpit
Park Hyeon-jin
Phe Reds

Producers and DJs
Cha Cha Malone
Yultron
DJ SMMT

AREA
GroovyRoom
Mirani
GEMINI
Dawn
BLASE

Former artists
Raz Simone
G.Soul (Golden)
Ted Park
Souf Souf
28AV 
Jarv Dee
Mokyo
Woogie
Sik-K
Jay B

Discography

Awards and nominations

Tours
H1ghr Music US Tour 2018

References

External links
 Official Facebook

Talent agencies of South Korea
Labels distributed by CJ E&M Music and Live
South Korean hip hop record labels
CJ E&M Music and Live subsidiaries
CJ E&M Music Performance Division